Parrhasius m-album, or the white M hairstreak, is a species of butterfly of the family Lycaenidae. It is found in the United States from western Connecticut to southeast Iowa, southern Missouri to east Texas, the Gulf Coast, and peninsular Florida. On rare occasions some stray to Michigan and Wisconsin.

The wingspan of Parrhasius m-album is 32–41 mm.

The larvae feed on Quercus virginiana and other Quercus species.

References

Butterflies of North America
Eumaeini
Butterflies described in 1833
Taxa named by Jean Baptiste Boisduval
Taxa named by John Eatton Le Conte